Brazil–United Kingdom relations are the diplomatic relations between Brazil and the United Kingdom. Both nations are members of the G20, United Nations and the World Trade Organization.

Country comparison

History
In 1825, the United Kingdom (UK) recognized Brazil's independence from Portugal. In 1826, Brazil and the UK signed a treaty to abolish the slave trade in Brazil, the British-Brazilian Treaty of 1826. However, slave trafficking continued unabated to Brazil, and the British government's passage of the Aberdeen Act of 1845 authorized British warships to board Brazilian shipping and seize any found involved in the slave trade. In 1861, a diplomatic crisis ensued between both nations when a British merchant ship Prince of Wales was wrecked off the coast of Rio Grande do Sul and many of its commodities were seized and crew imprisoned. This was correlated with the Aberdeen Act as the UK supported the abolition of slavery in Brazil as a means to increase the number of consumers of British products. This diplomatic crisis became known as the Christie Question which led Brazil to break diplomatic relations with the UK. Diplomatic relations were once again restored five years later.

In June 1871, Emperor Pedro II of Brazil paid a six-week visit to the UK. During his stay, the Emperor met with Queen Victoria at both Windsor Castle and at Osborne House on the Isle of Wight. The Emperor would return to the UK for a second time in 1876 during his second European tour. In 1901, both nations signed a border agreement between Brazil and British Guiana. In 1919, both nations elevated their diplomatic legations to embassies.

During World War II, both nations fought side by side during the Italian campaign. In November 1968, Queen Elizabeth II paid her first and only official visit to Brazil. During the Falklands War between the UK and Argentina; Brazil remained strategically neutral during the conflict, however, the Brazilian government maintained that Argentina had rights to the Falkland Islands and banned British aircraft from landing in Brazil.

In 1997, Fernando Henrique Cardoso became the first Brazilian President to pay a visit to the UK. In 2001, Tony Blair became the first British Prime Minister to visit Brazil. There would later be several visits and reunions between leaders of both nations, including visits to Brazil by the British royal family.

During the 7 July 2005 London bombings, British police misidentified a man as a suspect during the bombings and fatally shot Brazilian national Jean Charles de Menezes on 22 July. The incident brought tension in the relationship between both nations.

Since the incident, diplomatic relations between both nations have improved. The UK has seen the growing political and economic importance of Brazil as an opportunity. Furthermore, the UK has explicitly supported Brazil for a permanent membership of the United Nations Security Council, as part of wider UN reform. The UK ranks ninth on the list of countries with the highest flows of direct investments in Brazil, with US$1.17 billion in gross inflows that occurred in 2017.

In January 2020, the UK has sought a trade deal with Mercosur (which includes Brazil) following the UK leaving the European Union with Brexit.

In September 2021, Brazilian President Jair Bolsonaro claimed that British Prime Minister Boris Johnson had approached him asking for an "emergency food deal" to cover for food products missing in the UK. This claim was disputed by British officials.

High-level visits

High-level visits from Brazil to the United Kingdom
 President Fernando Henrique Cardoso (1997)
 President Luiz Inácio Lula da Silva (2003, 2005, 2006, 2009)
 President Dilma Rousseff (2012)
 Foreign Minister Antonio Patriota (2013)
 Foreign Minister Aloysio Nunes (2017)
 President Jair Bolsonaro (2022, for the funeral of Queen Elizabeth II)

High-level visits from the United Kingdom to Brazil
 Queen Elizabeth II (1968)
 Prince Charles (1978, 1991, 2002, 2009)
 Prime Minister Tony Blair (2001)
 Secretary of State Margaret Beckett (2006)
 Prime Minister Gordon Brown (2009)
 Prime Minister David Cameron (2012)
 Secretary of State William Hague (2014)

Bilateral agreements
Both nations have signed a few agreements such a Treaty to abolish the slave trade (1826); Agreement for the exchange of information relating to tax matters (2011); Memorandum of Understanding to strengthen trade ties and to accelerate the review of patent applications (2018) and an Agreement to promote cooperation on public healthcare (2019).

Resident diplomatic missions
 Brazil has an embassy in London and a consulate-general in Edinburgh.
 United Kingdom has an embassy in Brasília and consulates-general in Belo Horizonte, Recife, Rio de Janeiro and São Paulo.

See also
 Brazilians in the United Kingdom
 English Brazilians
 Scottish Brazilians
 List of ambassadors of the United Kingdom to Brazil

References 

 
United Kingdom
Bilateral relations of the United Kingdom